Peter Hoffmann may refer to:

 Peter Hoffmann (historian) (born 1930), German Canadian professor of history
 Peter Hoffmann (canoeist) (born 1941), German former sprint canoer
 Peter Hoffmann (runner) (born 1956), British athlete

See also
 Peter Hofmann (1944–2010), German operatic tenor
 Peter Hofmann (handball) (born 1955), former East German handball player
 Pete Hoffman (1919–2013), American cartoonist
 Peter Hovmand (born 1974), Danish writer
 Pieter Hofman (1640–1692), Flemish Baroque painter